The Gabela akalat (Sheppardia gabela) is a species of bird in the family Muscicapidae. It is endemic to Angola. The name is in part derived from the town where they were first observed, Gabela.

Its natural habitat is subtropical or tropical moist montane forests. It is threatened by habitat loss.

References

Gabela akalat
Endemic birds of Angola
Gabela akalat
Gabela akalat
Taxonomy articles created by Polbot